Barrington St Aubyn Browne (born 16 September 1967, in New Amsterdam, Guyana) is a former West Indian cricketer who played four ODIs; all against India in 1994. He represented Guyana in West Indies domestic cricket.

References
 

1967 births
Living people
Guyanese cricketers
West Indies One Day International cricketers
Demerara cricketers
Marylebone Cricket Club cricketers
Cheshire cricketers
Guyana cricketers
People from New Amsterdam, Guyana
Scarborough Festival President's XI cricketers